Ballyroney Castle was a castle situated at Ballyroney, County Down, Northern Ireland. Originally constructed sometime in the 12th century as a motte and bailey castle, it was rebuilt by Justiciar of Ireland, John FitzGeoffrey in 1248.

References
 Bardon, Jonathan, A History of Ulster. The Black Staff Press, 2005. 

Buildings and structures completed in 1248
Castles in County Down